Otha Donner Wearin (January 10, 1903 – April 3, 1990) was a writer and politician. Elected as the youngest member of Franklin D. Roosevelt's first "New Deal" Congress, his political career stalled in 1938 when he gave up his seat at Roosevelt's urging to run for a U.S. Senate seat held by another Democrat, Guy M. Gillette, but primary voters rallied behind Gillette. He became a prolific writer, which led to his election to the Cowboy Hall of Fame.

Personal background
Wearin was born on a farm near Hastings, Iowa in Mills County and graduated from Grinnell College in Grinnell, Iowa. While returning to Mills County to farm, the reputation he developed as a writer helped to jump-start his political career. He travelled to Europe to inspect their farming methods, which he described in articles printed in rural Iowa newspapers and published in his first book, "An Iowa Farmer Abroad."  By age 25, a newspaper reported that he had already "gained prominence as a farm bureau speaker and writer in the past few years." Later that year he was elected to the Iowa House of Representatives as a Democrat, even though his home county was a traditional Republican stronghold and the influence of native-son presidential candidate Herbert Hoover at the top of the Republican ticket led to Republican gains throughout Iowa. He served two terms in the Iowa House, winning re-election in 1930.

Congress
In 1932, he became the first Democrat ever to win election to the U.S. House seat for Iowa's 7th congressional district. As a twenty-nine-year-old, he was Congress's youngest member.  Congressman Wearin was known for his progressive ideals.  He was re-elected in 1934 and in 1936, but by increasingly narrow margins in the general elections.  In 1938 he sought the Democratic nomination for U. S. Senator, having the support of President Franklin D. Roosevelt, who was trying to purge Senator Guy M. Gillette, but he lost in the primary.

Later election bids
In 1950 he made a second unsuccessful attempt to win the Democratic nomination for Iowa's second seat in the U.S. Senate. He finished a distant third in the primary, behind Al Loveland and Nelson Kraschel. In 1952 he sought unsuccessfully the Democratic nomination for Governor of Iowa, losing in the primary to Herschel C. Loveless.

In 1969, after Iowa's state senator resigned one year before his term ended, Wearin was nominated by his party as the Democratic candidate in the special election to succeed him.  However, Wearin's Republican opponent, Earl Bass, won the election.

After politics
After the end of his active political career, Wearin raised purebred Angus cattle on the  family estate, "Nishna Vale," near Hastings.  Despite deterioration of his eyesight, he wrote books and articles, studied Iowa history, and worked in conservation.

As a writer of westerns, his books include Before the Colors Fade, (1971), Along Our Country Road, (1985), I Remember Yesteryear (1974), Heinhold's First and Last Chance Saloon: Jack London's Rendezvous (1974) and Grass Grown Trails (1981).  His writings were cited in his 1985 induction into the Cowboy Hall of Fame. Outside of that genre, he wrote many other books, including Century on an Iowa Farm (1959), I Remember Hastings (1965),  Political Americana (1967), Clarence Arthur Ellsworth,: Artist of the Old West, 1885-1964, (1967) Country Roads to Washington  (1976), and Rhymes of a Plain Countryman (1980).

He died at Glenwood, Iowa and is buried at Malvern, Iowa.

References

1903 births
1990 deaths
Grinnell College alumni
Democratic Party members of the Iowa House of Representatives
Writers from Iowa
People from Mills County, Iowa
American cattlemen
Democratic Party members of the United States House of Representatives from Iowa
20th-century American businesspeople
20th-century American politicians
20th-century American male writers
Western (genre) writers